Athanase Kignelman Ouattara (born June 6, 1988), is an Ivorian footballer. He currently plays for Thai Premier League clubside Pattaya United.

External links
Profile at Thaipremierleague.co.th
-Pattaya United Squad

Living people
Ivorian footballers
1988 births
Expatriate footballers in Thailand
Ivorian expatriate sportspeople in Thailand
Footballers from Abidjan
Association football defenders
Royal Thai Navy F.C.
Kignelman Athanase